McCague is a surname. Notable people with the surname include:

 Martin McCague (born 1969), English cricketer
 George McCague (1929–2014), Canadian politician
 Seán McCague (1944/45–2022), Gaelic Athletic Association President
 Zelda McCague (1888–2001), Canadian supercentenarian